Spaceman is the sixth studio album by American guitarist Ace Frehley, released on October 19, 2018. The album features a guest appearance from Frehley's former Kiss bandmate Gene Simmons who also co-wrote two tracks.

The album features three alternative covers.

Album information
Spaceman features a reunion of sorts with Frehley's former Kiss bandmate Gene Simmons, who co-wrote and played bass on the opener "Without You I'm Nothing". He also co-wrote "Your Wish Is My Command", which Simmons intended for Kiss to record. Simmons named Spaceman.

"Rockin' With the Boys" was mentioned as a Frehley song title for the upcoming Kiss album (before Music From the Elder) by Kerrang! magazine in 1981. It is not known how, except for the title, his 1981 song relates to the one he recorded for this album.

Track listing

Personnel
 Ace Frehley – vocals, guitars (all); bass guitar (track 2, 4-5, 7-9); creative direction and design
 Gene Simmons – bass guitar (track 1)
 Scot Coogan – drums (track 1,3-4,7); background vocals (track 3-4)
 Alex Salzman – co-producer/recording engineer (tracks 1-8); background vocals (track 2-4; bass guitar (track 3, 6)
 Rachael Gordon – background vocals (track 2-3)
 Matt Starr – drums (track 2, 6, 9)
 Ronnie Mancuso – additional guitar (track 4, 7)
 Anton Fig – drums (track 5, 8)
 Warren Huart – recording engineer (track 9); guitar (track 9), mix (all tracks)
 Eric Gonzalez – mixing assistant
 Andrew Perez – mixing assistant
 Hayden Cluff – assistant engineer for Warren Huart
 Jay Gilbett – photographer
 Paul Grosso – creative direction and design
 Adam Ayhan – mastering

Charts

References

External links
Ace Frehley official website

2018 albums
Ace Frehley albums
Kiss (band)
MNRK Music Group albums